This is a list of famous scientists from India.

A
Agnikumar G. Vedeshwar
Aryabhata II
Arvind Joshi
Abhay Ashtekar
Abhay Bhushan
Abhik Ghosh
Aditi Pant
A. P. J. Abdul Kalam
Ajoy Ghose
Akhilesh K. Gaharwar
Aloke Paul
Amar Gupta
Anna Mani
Avinash Kak
Ashoke Sen
Asoke Nath Mitra
Amar Bose
Asima Chatterjee
A. S. Kiran Kumar
Anil Kakodkar
Animesh Chakravorty
A. Sivathanu Pillai
Amal Kumar Raychaudhuri
Ajoy Ghatak
Ambarish Ghosh
Arun K. Pati
Archana Bhattacharyya
Amitava Raychaudhuri
A. P. Balachandran
A. S. Rao
Amartya Sen
Ankit Singh
Alex James

B 
 Birbal Sahni
 Brahmagupta
 Biman Bagchi
 Bola Vithal Shetty
 Bhāskara I
 Bhāskara II
 Benjamin Peary Pal
 Bikas Chakrabarti
 Biswarup Mukhopadhyaya
 B. L. K. Somayajulu
 B. V. Sreekantan

C 
 C. N. R. Rao
 Chanakya
 Charaka
 Chandrasekhara Venkata Raman (C. V. Raman)
 Chitra Mandal
 K. S. Chandrasekharan
 Charusita Chakravarty
 Chanchal Kumar Majumdar
 C. S. Seshadri
 C. K. Raju

D 
 Daya Shankar Kulshreshtha
 Debasish Ghose
 Dipan Ghosh
 Dronamraju Krishna Rao
 Daulat Singh Kothari
 Darshan Ranganathan
 Dadaji Ramaji Khobragade
 Dattatreyudu Nori
 Darashaw Nosherwan Wadia
 D. S. Kothari
 Daya-Nand Verma

E 
E. C. George Sudarshan
E. S. Raja Gopal

G 
 G Madhavan Nair
 G. K. Ananthasuresh
 Giridhar Madras
 G. N. Ramachandran
 G. R. Desiraju
 Gaiti Hasan
 Gajendra Pal Singh Raghava
 Ganapathi Thanikaimoni
 Gandikota V. Rao
 George Sudarshan
 Gomatam Ravi
 Govindarajan Padmanabhan
 Gursaran Talwar
 Ganeshan Venkataraman
 G. Naresh Patwari
 Ghanshyam Swarup
 Govind Swarup
 Gopinath Kartha

H 
 H. R. Krishnamurthy
 Halayudha
 Har Gobind Khorana
 Harsh Vardhan Batra
 Himmatrao Bawaskar
 Homi Jehangir Bhabha
 Homi Sethna
 Hari Balakrishnan
 Harish-Chandra

I 
 Indrani Bose
 Indumadhab Mallick

J 
 Jagdish Chandra Bose(Father of Radio science)
 Jagdish Shukla
 Jayant Narlikar
 Jogesh Pati
 Jyeshtharaj Joshi
 Janaki Ammal
 Jnan Chandra Ghosh
 Jasbir Singh Bajaj
 Jitendra Nath Goswami

K 
 Kookal Ramunni Krishnan
 K. R. Ramanathan
 K. Radhakrishnan
 K. Sridhar
 Kailas Nath Kaul
 Kamala Sohonie
 Kanada (Father of Atomic Theory) 
 Kariamanickam Srinivasa Krishnan
 Kavita Shah
 Kedareswar Banerjee
 Kewal Krishan
 Kotcherlakota Rangadhama Rao
 Krishnaswamy Kasturirangan
 Krityunjai Prasad Sinha
 Kailasavadivoo Sivan
 K. S. Chandrasekharan
 K. Ananda Rau
 K. S. R. Krishna Raju
 K. S. Krishnan
 K. N. Shankara
 K. R. K. Easwaran
 Kamanio Chattopadhyay
 Kalpana Chawla
 K. N. Ganeshaiah

L 
 Lilabati Bhattacharjee
 Lov Grover
 L. A. Ramdas

M 
 M. G. K. Menon
 M. L. Madan
 M. O. P. Iyengar
 M. S. Balakrishnan
 M. S. Swaminathan
 Madhav Gadgil
 Madhava-kara
 Anita Mahadevan-Jansen
 Mahāvīra
 Manoj Kumar
 Manchanahalli Rangaswamy Satyanarayana Rao
 Manilal Bhaumik
 Manindra Agrawal
 Manjula Reddy
 Mathukumalli Vidyasagar
 Meghnad Saha
 Michael Lobo
 Mirza Faizan
 Sir M. Visvesvaraya
 Mylswamy Annadurai
 Mani Lal Bhaumik
 Madan Rao
 M. S. Narasimhan
 M. S. Raghunathan
 Maneesha S. Inamdar
 M. S. Krishnan
 Manjul Bhargava

N 
 Nagendra Kumar Singh
 Nambi Narayanan
 Nandini Harinath
 Narendra Karmarkar
 Naresh Dadhich
 Narinder Singh Kapany 
 Nitya Anand
 Nautam Bhatt
 Narasimhaiengar Mukunda
 Nilamber Pant

O 
 Obaid Siddiqi

P 
 Padmanabhan Balaram
 Pamposh Bhat
 Pandurang Sadashiv Khankhoje
 Panini
 Patcha Ramachandra Rao
 Pathani Samanta
 Pingala
 Pisharoth Rama Pisharoty
 Prafulla Chandra Ray
 Prahalad Chunnilal Vaidya
 Pranav Mistry
 Prasanta Chandra Mahalanobis
 Praveen Kumar Gorakavi
 Prabhat Ranjan Sarkar
 Prem Chand Pandey
 Panchanan Maheshwari
 Phoolan Prasad
 Purnima Sinha
 Pragya D. Yadav
 Predhiman Krishan Kaw
 Probir Roy
 P. K. Iyengar
 Prem Shanker Goel
 P. Kunhikrishnan

R 
 Ram Rajasekharan
 Raghunath Anant Mashelkar
 Raj Reddy
 Raja Ramanna
 Rajeev Motwani
 Rajeev Kumar Varshney
 Rajesh Gopakumar
 Ram Chet Chaudhary
 Radhanath Sikdar  
 Ranajit Chakraborty
 Rani Bang
 Rashna Bhandari
 Ravindra Shripad Kulkarni
 Roddam Narasimha
 Ramesh Raskar
 Rohini Godbole
 Ratan Lal Brahmachary
 Rajagopala Chidambaram
 Radha Balakrishnan
 Rama Govindarajan
 Ramamurti Rajaraman
 Ritu Karidhal
 Raghavan Narasimhan
 Rohini Balakrishnan
 Ranjan Roy Daniel
 Ravindra Kumar Sinha

S
 Salim Yusuf
 Samarendra Nath Biswas
 Samir K. Brahmachari
 Sandip Trivedi
 Sankar K. Pal
 Sanghamitra Bandyopadhyay
 Santanu Bhattacharya
 Satish Dhawan
 Satish Kumar
 Satya Churn Law
 Satyendra Nath Bose (Father of God Particle)
 Seema Bhatnagar, Indian scientist, working in the field of Anticancer Drug Discovery.
 Shankar Abaji Bhise
 Shanti Swarup Bhatnagar
 Shekhar C. Mande
 Shipra Guha-Mukherjee
 Shiraz Minwalla
 Shivram Bhoje
 Shrinivas Kulkarni
 Shreeram Shankar Abhyankar
 Shridhar Venkatesh Ketkar
 Siva S. Banda
 Sivaram Murthy
 Srikumar Banerjee
 Srinivasa Ramanujan
 Subhash Chandra Lakhotia
 Subhash Kak
 Subhash Mukhopadhyay
 Subhendu Guha
 Subramanyan Chandrasekhar
 Subrata Roy
 Sujoy K. Guha
 Sunder Lal Hora
 Sunil Mukhi
 Surendra Nath Pandeya
 Suri Bhagavantam
 Sushanta Kumar Dattagupta
 Sushruta 
 Swapan Chattopadhyay
 VA Shiva Ayyadurai
 Subbayya Sivasankaranarayana Pillai
 Subramanian Anantha Ramakrishna
 Salim Ali
 Surindar Kumar Trehan
 S. Somanath
 Siva Brata Bhattacherjee
 Surajit Chandra Sinha
 Sisir Kumar Mitra
 Subramania Ranganathan
 Sudipta Sengupta
 Somak Raychaudhury
 S. A. Hussain
 Sam Pitroda
 Syed Zahoor Qasim
 Sudhir Kumar Vempati
 Shubha Tole
 Suchitra Sebastian
 Sulabha K. Kulkarni
 S. K. Shivakumar
 Shya Chitaley
 Shobhona Sharma
 S. Pancharatnam
 Shiv Ram Kashyap
 Sambhu Nath De
 Shyama Charan Dube

T
 T. V. Ramakrishnan
 Tapan Misra
 Tej P Singh
 Thanu Padmanabhan
 Thirumalachari Ramasami
 Tathagat Avatar Tulsi
 Thekkethil Kochandy Alex
 Tanjore Ramachandra Anantharaman

U 
 U. Aswathanarayana
 Udipi Ramachandra Rao
 Ujjwal Maulik
 Uma Ramakrishnan
 Uddhab Bharali
 Upendranath Brahmachari
 Upinder Singh Bhalla
 Usha Kulshreshtha
 Umesh Waghmare

V 
 V. Balakrishnan
 V. K. Saraswat
 V. K. Aatre
 V. S. Huzurbazar
 Varāhamihira
 Varun Sahni
 Vashishtha Narayan Singh
 Vasudeva Krishnamurthy
 Veena Parnaik
 Venkatraman Ramakrishnan
 Vainu Bappu
 Vidya Arankalle
 Vidyavati
 Vijay P. Bhatkar
 Vikram Sarabhai
 Vinod Johri
 Vasant Ranchhod Gowarikar
 Vishnu Vasudev Narlikar
 Vijay Kumar Kapahi
 Vinod K. Singh
 Vinod Dham (Father of Modern Microprocessor Chips)

W 
 Waman Dattatreya Patwardhan

Y 
 Yelavarthy Nayudamma
 Yellapragada Subbarow
 Yamuna Krishnan
 Yash Pal
 Yusuf Hamied

See also

 List of Indians
 Lists of scientists

References